Manoel Island, formerly known as Bishop's Island or the Isolotto, is a small island which forms part of the municipality of Gżira in Marsamxett Harbour, Malta. It is named after the Portuguese Grand Master António Manoel de Vilhena, who built a fort on the island in the 1720s.

Geography

Manoel Island is a low, rather flat hill, shaped roughly like a leaf. It is located in the middle of Marsamxett Harbour, with Lazzaretto Creek to its south and Sliema Creek to its north. The island is connected to mainland Malta by a bridge. The whole island can be viewed from the bastions of the capital Valletta.

History
In 1570, the island was acquired by the Cathedral Chapter of Mdina and it became the property of the Bishop of Malta. It was therefore called l'Isola del Vescovo or il-Gżira tal-Isqof in Maltese (the Bishop's Island).

In 1592, a quarantine hospital known as the Lazzaretto was built during an outbreak of the plague. The hospital was made of wooden huts, and it was pulled down a year later after the disease had subsided. In 1643, during the reign of Grandmaster Lascaris, the Order of Saint John exchanged the island with the church for some land in Rabat and built a permanent Lazzaretto in an attempt to control the periodic influx of plague and cholera on board visiting ships. It was initially used as a quarantine centre where passengers from quarantined ships were taken. The hospital was subsequently improved during the reigns of Grandmasters Cotoner, Carafa and de Vilhena.

Between 1723 and 1733, a new star fort was built on the island by the Portuguese Grand Master António Manoel de Vilhena. The fort was called Fort Manoel after the Grand Master, and the island was renamed at this point. The fort is considered a typical example of 18th century military engineering, and its original plans are attributed to René Jacob de Tigné, and are said to have been modified by his friend and colleague Charles François de Mondion, who is buried in a crypt beneath Fort Manoel. The Fort has a magnificent quadrangle, parade ground and arcade, and once housed a baroque chapel dedicated to St. Anthony of Padua, under the direct command of the Order.

In the British period, the Lazzaretto continued to be used and was enlarged during the governorship of Sir Henry Bouverie in 1837 and 1838. It was briefly used to house troops but was converted back into a hospital in 1871. During the course of the 19th century, some incoming mail was fumigated and disinfected at the Profumo Office of the hospital to prevent the spread of diseases.

During World War II, when Malta was under siege, Manoel Island and its fort were used as a naval base by the Royal Navy's 10th Submarine Flotilla, at which time it was referred to as "HMS Talbot" or "HMS Phœnicia". The Chapel of St. Anthony was destroyed following a direct hit by Luftwaffe bombers in March 1942. The island and the fort remained derelict for many years and Fort Manoel and the Lazzaretto were both vandalized.

Present day

Yacht Marina and Yacht Yard

Manoel Island currently houses a yacht yard and yacht marina. The yacht marina has been under new management since 2011, and it accommodates vessels up to 80 metres in length. It has a total of 350 berths.

The yacht yard can accommodate yachts and catamarans of up to 50 metres in length and a displacement of 500 tons. The yard offers boat storage, berthing afloat, repairs and complete refits.

Duck Village

For several years, Manoel Island has housed a quaint, informal sanctuary for ducks and other waterfowl near the bridge connecting the island with the main island. It was created and is maintained by a local volunteer, and funded entirely by private donations. The site has been demolished in 2021, due to several complaints by residents and activists.

References 

Islands of Malta
Uninhabited islands of Malta
Gżira